Oleg Vladimirovich Tarabanov (born 1 August 1997) is a Russian football player.

Club career
He made his debut in the Russian Football National League for FC Irtysh Omsk on 22 August 2020 in a game against FC Spartak-2 Moscow.

References

External links
 
 Profile by Russian Football National League
 

1997 births
Sportspeople from Omsk
Living people
Russian footballers
Association football midfielders
FC Irtysh Omsk players
Russian First League players
Russian Second League players